Eucithara decussata is a small sea snail, a marine gastropod mollusk in the family Mangeliidae.

Distribution
This marine species is found off Paumotus, Polynesia.

Description
The length of the shell attains 10 mm, its diameter 4.5 mm.

(Original description) The white shell has a fusiform, ovate shape. The whorls are somewhat concavely, widely angulated around the upper part. They are longitudinally plicately ribbed. The ribs descend from the sutures and are nodulous at the angle, transversely elevated, striated, decussated by very finelongitudinal striae. The aperture is one-half the length of the shell.

References

External links
  Tucker, J.K. 2004 Catalog of recent and fossil turrids (Mollusca: Gastropoda). Zootaxa 682:1-1295

decussata
Gastropods described in 1868